The Albania women's national under-18 basketball team is a national basketball team of Albania, administered by the Albanian Basketball Association (FSHB).
It represents the country in women's international under-18 basketball competitions.

The team finished 3rd at the 2005 Under-18 European Promotion Cup for Women and 2022 FIBA U18 Women's European Championship Division C.

See also
Albania women's national basketball team
Albania women's national under-16 basketball team
Albania men's national under-18 basketball team

References

External links
Archived records of Albania team participations

under
Women's national under-18 basketball teams